The Women's 4x100m Freestyle Relay event at the 2003 Pan American Games took place on August 14, 2003 (Day 13 of the Games).

Medalists

Records

Results

Notes

References
2003 Pan American Games Results: Day 13, CBC online; retrieved 2009-06-13.
usaswimming
swimnews

Freestyle Relay, Women's 4x100m
2003 in women's swimming
Swim